Hobart Baldwin Bigelow (May 16, 1834 – October 12, 1891) was an American politician and the 50th Governor of Connecticut.

Biography
Bigelow was born in North Haven, New Haven County, Connecticut, on May 16, 1834. He was educated in the South Egremont Academy in Massachusetts. On May 6, 1857, he married Eleanor Lewis and they had four children; Frank Lewis, Eleanor Mary, Walter Pierpont, and Philo Lewis, who died at two weeks.

Career
In 1851 Bigelow left there and afterward learned the machinist's trade at Guilford, Connecticut, with local companies. He became a leading manufacturer of boilers and heavy machinery. He purchased the Bigelow Manufacturing Company in 1861, which later conducted business under the name of the H.B. Bigelow & Co. He served as the company's president for life.

Bigelow served as councilman of New Haven from 1863 to 1876. He then served as mayor of New Haven from 1879 to 1881. He also served as a member of the Connecticut House of Representatives in 1875.

Bigelow was the Republican nominee and was elected the Governor of Connecticut on November 2, 1880. He was sworn into office on January 5, 1881. During his term, legislation was enacted that disallowed deceptive election registration procedures and a bill was constituted that regulated companies of 12 or more employees to install fire escapes. The Storrs Agricultural School was founded and assessments were cut back on mutual life insurance companies.

Bigelow left office on January 3, 1883 and retired from public service. He was a delegate to Republican National Convention from Connecticut, 1880.

Death
On October 12, 1891, Bigelow died at the New Haven House hotel on October 12, 1891).  He is interred at Evergreen Cemetery, New Haven, Connecticut.

References

External links
 Sobel, Robert and John Raimo. Biographical Directory of the Governors of the United States, 1789-1978. Greenwood Press, 1988. 
 
National Governors Association

The Political Graveyard
Bigelow Society, Inc.
The governors of Connecticut: biographies

1834 births
1891 deaths
Republican Party governors of Connecticut
Connecticut city council members
Mayors of New Haven, Connecticut
Republican Party members of the Connecticut House of Representatives
19th-century American politicians
People from North Haven, Connecticut